Four ships of the Royal Navy have borne the name HMS Goree, after the island of Gorée, and its capture by the British in 1758:

 HMS Goree was a 10-gun sloop launched in 1729 as the storeship hoy . She was converted and renamed HMS Goree in 1759 and was broken up in 1763.
  was a sloop captured from the French in 1759 and paid off in 1763.
  was a 16-gun sloop captured from the French in 1800 and sold in 1806.
She was captured by the French in 1806, recaptured in 1807 and taken into the navy as HMS Goree. She became a prison hulk in 1814 and was broken up in 1817.

See also
 , a frigate in service from 1943 to 1946

Royal Navy ship names